The Davey River is a perennial river located in the south-west region of Tasmania, Australia.

Course and features
The Davey River rises on the western slopes of the Frankland Range, below Coronation Peak, and flows generally south by west through the Southwest National Park, joined by ten tributaries including the Lora, Frankland, Hardwood, Crossing, and De Witt rivers. The river reaches its mouth in Payne Bay, an inner part of Port Davey, and empties out into the Southern Ocean. The river descends  over its  course.

A section of the lower Davey River gorge is known as Hells Gates, - providing confusion with the entry to Macquarie Harbour which has an entrance by the same name - Hells Gates.

See also

 Rivers of Tasmania

References

Further reading
 
 Gee, H and Fenton, J. (Eds) (1978)  The South West Book - A Tasmanian Wilderness Melbourne, Australian Conservation Foundation. 
 Neilson, D. (1975)  South West Tasmania - A land of the Wild. Adelaide. Rigby. 
 Waterman, Peter (editor) (1981) Davey River catchment Sandy Bay, Tas. : Steering Committee, South West Tasmania Resources Survey. Working paper (South West Tasmania Resources Survey) ; no. 20.

External links
Palaeozoic Rocks of the Davey River, South-West Tasmania

Rivers of Tasmania
South West Tasmania